Leontoceryx is an extinct, little-known genus of pantherine felid. It was named by Kretzoi Miklos based on a single lower canine of relatively stout form, with a distinct outer groove. The canine was noted as being similar to some specimens of Machairodus schlosseri (which is a synonym of Paramachaerodus orientalis).

References

Prehistoric felines
Fossil taxa described in 1938
Prehistoric carnivoran genera